Zhao Shasha (born September 17, 1987) is a female wrestler from China.

See also
China at the 2012 Summer Olympics

External links
 

Living people
1987 births
Chinese female sport wrestlers
Wrestlers at the 2012 Summer Olympics
Olympic wrestlers of China
Wrestlers at the 2010 Asian Games

World Wrestling Championships medalists
Asian Games competitors for China
Asian Wrestling Championships medalists
21st-century Chinese women